Audi filia et and De sinu patris were two letters written by either Pope Urban IV (1165–1264) or Pope Clement IV (1200–1268). They are undated, but were probably written during the 1260s, separately chastising one noblewoman and one nobleman for inappropriate activities. According to historians such as Hans E. Mayer and Peter W. Edbury, the letters were written in 1261 or 1262, and were intended for the Cypriote queen Plaisance of Antioch  (1235–1261) and her lover John of Jaffa (1215–1266), who left his wife Marie of Armenia to pursue the relationship. Other historians such as David Nicolle, Steven Runciman and Christopher Tyerman believe that the date is more likely 1268, that the noblewoman was another Cypriot queen, Isabella of Ibelin (1252–1282), and it was her affair with Julian of Sidon (born c. 1230, d. 1275) that prompted the papal letters.

Audi filia et

Audi filia et admonishes a dowager queen of Cyprus, telling her to give up her unchaste life because of the scandal it is causing among her subjects. She must either resume chastity or remarry, rather than burn in hell. It is not certain which queen is being referred to, but is likely either Plaisance of Antioch or Isabella of Ibelin. Queen Plaisance, who was widowed from King Henry I in 1253, married Balian of Arsuf and divorced him in 1258, and then had an affair with John of Jaffa. Isabella had been betrothed as a child to King Hugh II of Cyprus, who died in December 1267, leaving Isabella a teenaged widow who then engaged in an affair with Julian of Sidon.

De sinu patris

The other letter, De sinu patris, was addressed Nobili viro J. comiti to a count who had rejected his wife (a sister of the king of Armenia), and was engaged in an inappropriate relationship with an unnamed noblewoman. The count is ordered to cease his adultery and return to his family, or suffer the consequences. The recipient of this letter was likely John of Jaffa (married to Marie, a sister of King Hetoum I of Armenia), though some sources have identified the recipient as Julian of Sidon, who was married to Euthemia, King Hetoum I's daughter (and therefore sister of King Leo II of Armenia). A marginal note with the letter, arguitur de incestu quod dicebatur committere cum regina Cipri, stating it was not just an adulterous relationship but also an incestuous one, is probably referring to the fact that John of Jaffa was an Ibelin, grandson of Balian of Ibelin, and his mistress Isabella was Balian's great-great-granddaughter. At the time, this relationship meant they were forbidden to marry, and a sexual relationship would have therefore been regarded as incestuous. However, it is not clear who wrote the note, nor whether or not it is accurate. It may have simply been a misinterpretation at the time.

Numbering
Originally compiled by the papal notary Berardus of Naples, the letters Audi filia et and De sinu patris are numbered different ways in different compilations:
 Registrum Vaticanum 29A, numbers 1 and 2
 MS Bordeaux, Bibliothèque municipale 761, numbers 1 and 2
 MS Paris Lat. 4311 (Epistolae notabiles), numbers 7 and 8
 MS Vat. lat. 6735, numbers 7 and 8
 Rome, Biblioteca Vallicelliana MSC 49, numbers 279 and 3
 E. Jordan, Registres de Clement IV (Paris, 1893–1904), numbers 865 and 866 (dated as 1268)
 J. Guiraud, Registres d'Urbain IV, vol. 4 (Paris, 1906–1929), numbers 2807 and 2808 in appendix I (undated)
 A.L. Tautu, Acta Urbani IV, Clementis IV, Gregorii X (1261–176) e registris Vaticanis aliisque fontibus, numbers 28 and 28a
 Fritz Schillman, Die Formularsammlung des Marinus von Eboli, Bibliotek des Preussischen Historisichen Institute in Rom 16 (Rome, 1927), numbers 2434 and 2433
 Ernst Batzer, Zur Kenntnis der Formularzammlung des Richard vo Pofi, Heidelberger Abhandlungen zur mittleren und neueren Geschichte 28 (Heidelberg 1910): p. 112 (Audi filia) and p. 106 (De sinu patris)

References

Further reading
 Delisle, Leopold. "Notice sur cinq manuscrits de la Bibliotheque Nationale et sur un manuscrit de la Bibliotheque de Bordeaux contenant des recueils epistolaires de Berard de Naples", Notices et extraits des manuscrits de la Bibliotheque Nationale et autres bibliotheques, 27, 2 (1879): pp. 124–126
 Ferdinand Kaltenbrunner, "Romische Studien III. Die Briefsammlung des Berardus de Napoli", Mitteilungen des osterreichischen Institute fur Geschichtsforschung 7 (1886): pp. 21–118, 555–635

Documents of Pope Urban IV
Documents of Pope Clement IV
13th-century papal bulls